Monica: Still Standing is an American reality series from executive producer James DuBose, in conjunction with Jimmy Iovine. The series was first aired on BET October 27, 2009, plugged by the 2009 BET Hip Hop Awards which featured Monica joining Keyshia Cole on stage to deliver a live performance of the duet "Trust." Production of the ten part docu-series was strategically developed to gear towards Monica making an official comeback after lengthy hiatus. The show focused on searching for a hit single for her fifth studio album release, while aiming to balance her life with father of her children and former fiance Rocko da Don and recovery from a troubled past. Reports reveal Monica: Still Standing the television series is that which 'cemented' the success of Monica: Still Standing the 2010 album release of the same name of the series.

Overview
It focused on searching for a hit single for her fifth studio album release and balancing her personal life of being a full-time mother and troubled past. The strategic planning of the special leading to her successful return to the limelight following a ten-year hiatus from the recording industry, Monica—whose real name is Monica Denise Arnold—credited consulting producer of episode one, Ryan Glover  and executive producer of the project, James DuBose for helping to navigate the reemergence of her artistic career through the reality docu production of the BET broadcast; which led to both the 2009 DuBose Entertainment series and the 2009 Interscope Records album to be named: Monica: Still Standing""I have to be honest, I did not come up with the idea for the television show. I have to give credit to Ryan Glover and James DuBose that did "The Way It Is" for one of my good friends (Keyshia Cole)." – Monica

Cast

Main cast 
 Monica – R&B singer
 Melinda Dancil – Monica's cousin and manager
 Bryan Michael Cox – songwriter and record producer

Guest stars 
 Rocko Da Don
 Jermaine Dupri
 Kendrick "WyldCard" Dean
 Polow Da Don
 Timbaland
 Dallas Austin
 Soulja Boy Tell 'Em

Production
While searching for a hit single for her sixth studio album release, the singer balances her personal life of being a full-time mother and troubled past. The show was a spin-off to the one-hour reality special television show Monica: The Single on Atlanta's Peachtree TV on August 5, 2008. The series was later picked up by BET the following week. The show premiered on October 27, 2009 directly after the 2009 BET Hip Hop Awards. The series runs all-new episodes every Tuesday at 10 pm and 10:30 pm EST. The show has appearances by Bryan Michael Cox and Kendrick "WYLDCARD" Dean. Also stars Monica's trainer Carlos and her cousin Melinda.

Episodes

Ratings
The premiere and encore episode garnered 3.2 million total viewers. The James DuBose production was made the second highest series debut in BET history behind the debut of DuBose Entertainment's Tiny & Toya. The show was given a "B" by Entertainment Weekly.

References

External links
 Official website

BET original programming
2000s American reality television series
2009 American television series debuts
African-American reality television series
2010 American television series endings
2010s American reality television series